The 2017 Arkansas Razorbacks football team represented the University of Arkansas in the 2017 NCAA Division I FBS football season. The Razorbacks played their home games at Donald W. Reynolds Razorback Stadium in Fayetteville, Arkansas, with one home game at War Memorial Stadium in Little Rock. Arkansas played as a member of the Western Division of the Southeastern Conference (SEC). The team was captained by quarterback Austin Allen, defensive backs Santos Ramirez and Kevin Richardson II, and offensive lineman Frank Ragnow. The Razorbacks were led by fifth-year head coach Bret Bielema. Bielema was fired after the final game of the season.

Previous season

The 2016 Arkansas football team kicked off its season against the Louisiana Tech Bulldogs, and after a slow start and trailing after the third quarter, the Hogs scored with 6:37 to go in the game and opened their season with a victory, 21–20. The Razorbacks then traveled to Fort Worth to take on the #15 TCU Horned Frogs. Arkansas led 13–0 at halftime, and 20–7 after three quarters, but allowed three touchdowns in the fourth quarter and the game went to overtime. Arkansas & TCU exchanged touchdowns in overtime and Arkansas won in double overtime, 41–38, improving to 2–0. Arkansas went back home to play Texas State, and even with a shortened fourth quarter, they won 42–3 and remained unbeaten. The winning streak ended, however, when the Razorbacks traveled to Arlington to take on the #10 Texas A&M Aggies. Yet again, the Hogs came up short against A&M, and lost 24–45. The Hogs then defeated the Alcorn State Braves, 52–10. The second week in October saw Arkansas fall short yet again against Alabama. The next week, a late Jared Cornelius touchdown rush put Arkansas in the lead for good against Ole Miss, 34–30. On October 22, Arkansas failed in its attempt to defend its 4 overtime victory against Auburn, losing 3–56. November's first Razorback game saw the Hogs win their second ever game against Florida; Santos Ramirez opened the scoring with a 24-yard pick six and the Hogs didn't trail the entire game. After beating Florida 31–10, Arkansas lost the Golden Boot to LSU after two straight victories. A high scoring game at Mississippi State ended with a 58–42 Hogs victory, with both quarterbacks throwing for 2 touchdowns and both running backs scoring four. Arkansas closed its 2016 season with two losses; the first was a shock loss to rivals Missouri, 24–28. The second came in the Belk Bowl against Virginia Tech; Arkansas led 24–0 at halftime but gave up five touchdowns in the second half and lost 24–35, finishing the season 7–6 (3–5).

Roster

Schedule
The Razorbacks' 2017 schedule consists of 7 home games, 4 away games, and 1 neutral game in the regular season. The Razorbacks hosted SEC foes Auburn, Mississippi State, and Missouri, and traveled to South Carolina, Alabama,  Ole Miss, and LSU. Arkansas played against Texas A&M in Arlington, Texas for the fourth year in a row.

Arkansas hosted all four of its non–conference games; against Florida A&M from the Mid-Eastern Athletic Conference (in Little Rock), TCU from the Big 12 Conference, New Mexico State from the Sun Belt Conference, and Coastal Carolina (for homecoming), also from the Sun Belt.

The Razorbacks opened their season on a Thursday night for the first time since 2001.

Schedule Source:

Game summaries

Florida A&M

No. 23 TCU

vs Texas A&M

New Mexico State

at South Carolina

at No. 1 Alabama

No. 21 Auburn

at Ole Miss

Coastal Carolina

at LSU

No. 17 Mississippi State

Missouri

Rankings

Players drafted into the NFL

References

Arkansas
Arkansas Razorbacks football seasons
Arkansas Razorbacks football